In mathematics, the term weak inverse is used with several meanings.

Theory of semigroups 
In the theory of semigroups, a weak inverse of an element x in a semigroup  is an element y such that . If every element has a weak inverse, the semigroup is called an E-inversive or E-dense semigroup.

An element x of S for which there is an element y of S such that  is called regular. A regular semigroup is a semigroup in which every element is regular. This is a stronger notion than weak inverse. Every regular semigroup is E-inversive, but not vice versa.

If every element x in S has a unique inverse y in S in the sense that  and  then S is called an inverse semigroup.

Category theory 

See also 
 Generalized inverse
 Von Neumann regular ring

References 

Monoidal categories
Semigroup theory